The Cornwall League 1 2009–10 was a full season of rugby union within Cornwall League 1.

Team Changes
Roseland, as Champions, were promoted to the Tribute Cornwall/Devon League for season 2010-11. In the play-off for promotion to the Cornwall/Devon league, Veor lost to Honiton (12 - 43) and remained in the Tribute Cornwall League for the following season.

Table

 Points are awarded as follows:
2 pts for a win
1 pt for a draw
0 pts for a defeat
2 pts deducted for failing to fulfil a fixture

Play-off

References

Cornwall
2009
2000s in Cornwall
2010s in Cornwall